Theophylline, also known as 1,3-dimethylxanthine, is a phosphodiesterase inhibiting drug used in therapy for respiratory diseases such as chronic obstructive pulmonary disease (COPD) and asthma under a variety of brand names. As a member of the xanthine family, it bears structural and pharmacological similarity to theobromine and caffeine, and is readily found in nature, being present in tea (Camellia sinensis) and cocoa (Theobroma cacao). A small amount of theophylline is one of the products of caffeine metabolic processing in the liver.

Medical uses 
The main actions of theophylline involve:
 relaxing bronchial smooth muscle
 increasing heart muscle contractility and efficiency (positive inotrope)
 increasing heart rate (positive chronotropic)
 increasing blood pressure
 increasing renal blood flow
 anti-inflammatory effects
 central nervous system stimulatory effect mainly on the medullary respiratory center.

The main therapeutic uses of theophylline are aimed at:
 chronic obstructive pulmonary disease (COPD)
 asthma
 infant apnea
 Blocks the action of adenosine; an inhibitory neurotransmitter that induces sleep, contracts the smooth muscles and relaxes the cardiac muscle.
 Treatment of post-dural puncture headache.

Uses under investigation 
A clinical study reported in 2008 that theophylline was helpful in improving the sense of smell in study subjects with anosmia.

In 2004, a small clinical study compared theophylline to methylphenidate for the treatment of attention-deficit hyperactivity disorder in children and adolescents.

Adverse effects
The use of theophylline is complicated by its interaction with various drugs and by the fact that it has a narrow therapeutic window (<20 mcg/mL). Its use must be monitored by direct measurement of serum theophylline levels to avoid toxicity.  It can also cause nausea, diarrhea, increase in heart rate, abnormal heart rhythms, and CNS excitation (headaches, insomnia, irritability, dizziness and lightheadedness). Seizures can also occur in severe cases of toxicity, and are considered to be a neurological emergency. Its toxicity is increased by erythromycin, cimetidine, and fluoroquinolones, such as ciprofloxacin. Some lipid-based formulations of theophylline can result in toxic theophylline levels when taken with fatty meals, an effect called dose dumping, but this does not occur with most formulations of theophylline.  Theophylline toxicity can be treated with beta blockers.  In addition to seizures, tachyarrhythmias are a major concern. Theophylline should not be used in combination with the SSRI fluvoxamine.

Spectroscopy

UV-visible spectroscopy 
Theophylline is soluble in 0.1N NaOH and absorbs maximally at 277 nm with an extinction coefficient of 10,200 (cm−1 M−1).

Proton nuclear magnetic resonance spectroscopy (1H-NMR)
The characteristic signals, distinguishing theophylline from related methylxanthines, are approximately 3.23δ and 3.41δ, corresponding to the unique methylation possessed by theophylline. The remaining proton signal, at 8.01δ, corresponds to the proton on the imidazole ring, not transferred between the nitrogen. The transferred proton between the nitrogen is a variable proton and only exhibits a signal under certain conditions.

Carbon nuclear magnetic resonance spectroscopy (13C-NMR)
The unique methylation of theophylline corresponds to the following signals: 27.7δ and 29.9δ. The remaining signals correspond to carbons characteristic of the xanthine backbone.

Natural occurrences 
Theophylline is naturally found in cocoa beans.  Amounts as high as 3.7 mg/g have been reported in Criollo cocoa beans.

Trace amounts of theophylline are also found in brewed tea, although brewed tea provides only about 1 mg/L, which is significantly less than a therapeutic dose.

Trace amounts of theophylline are also found in guarana (Paullinia cupana) and in kola nuts cola (plant).

Pharmacology

Pharmacodynamics
Like other methylated xanthine derivatives, theophylline is both a
 competitive nonselective phosphodiesterase inhibitor, which raises intracellular cAMP, activates PKA, inhibits TNF-alpha and inhibits leukotriene synthesis, and reduces inflammation and innate immunity
 nonselective adenosine receptor antagonist, antagonizing A1, A2, and A3 receptors almost equally, which explains many of its cardiac effects

Theophylline has been shown to inhibit TGF-beta-mediated conversion of pulmonary fibroblasts into myofibroblasts in COPD and asthma via cAMP-PKA pathway and suppresses COL1 mRNA, which codes for the protein collagen.

It has been shown that theophylline may reverse the clinical observations of steroid insensitivity in patients with COPD and asthmatics who are active smokers (a condition resulting in oxidative stress) via a distinctly separate mechanism. Theophylline in vitro can restore the reduced HDAC (histone deacetylase) activity that is induced by oxidative stress (i.e., in smokers), returning steroid responsiveness toward normal. Furthermore, theophylline has been shown to directly activate HDAC2.  (Corticosteroids switch off the inflammatory response by blocking the expression of inflammatory mediators through deacetylation of histones, an effect mediated via histone deacetylase-2 (HDAC2). Once deacetylated, DNA is repackaged so that the promoter regions of inflammatory genes are unavailable for binding of transcription factors such as NF-κB that act to turn on inflammatory activity.  It has recently been shown that the oxidative stress associated with cigarette smoke can inhibit the activity of HDAC2, thereby blocking the anti-inflammatory effects of corticosteroids.)

Pharmacokinetics

Absorption
When theophylline is administered intravenously, bioavailability is 100%.

Distribution
Theophylline is distributed in the extracellular fluid, in the placenta, in the mother's milk and in the central nervous system. The volume of distribution is 0.5 L/kg. The protein binding is 40%. The volume of distribution may increase in neonates and those suffering from cirrhosis or malnutrition, whereas the volume of distribution may decrease in those who are obese.

Metabolism
Theophylline is metabolized extensively in the liver (up to 70%). It undergoes N-demethylation via cytochrome P450 1A2. It is metabolized by parallel first order and Michaelis-Menten pathways. Metabolism may become saturated (non-linear), even within the therapeutic range. Small dose increases may result in disproportionately large increases in serum concentration. Methylation to caffeine is also important in the infant population. Smokers and people with hepatic (liver) impairment metabolize it differently. Both THC and nicotine have been shown to increase the rate of theophylline metabolism.

Excretion
Theophylline is excreted unchanged in the urine (up to 10%). Clearance of the drug is increased in children (age 1 to 12), teenagers (12 to 16), adult smokers, elderly smokers, as well as in cystic fibrosis, and hyperthyroidism. Clearance of the drug is decreased in these conditions: elderly, acute congestive heart failure, cirrhosis, hypothyroidism and febrile viral illnesses.

The elimination half-life varies: 30 hours for premature neonates, 24 hours for neonates, 3.5 hours for children ages 1 to 9, 8 hours for adult non-smokers, 5 hours for adult smokers, 24 hours for those with hepatic impairment, 12 hours for those with congestive heart failure NYHA class I-II, 24 hours for those with congestive heart failure NYHA class III-IV, 12 hours for the elderly.

History
Theophylline was first extracted from tea leaves and chemically identified around 1888 by the German biologist Albrecht Kossel. Seven years later, a chemical synthesis starting with 1,3-dimethyluric acid was described by Emil Fischer and Lorenz Ach. The Traube purine synthesis, an alternative method to synthesize theophylline, was introduced in 1900 by another German scientist, Wilhelm Traube. Theophylline's first clinical use came in 1902 as a diuretic. It took an additional 20 years until it was first reported as an asthma treatment. The drug was prescribed in a syrup up to the 1970s as Theostat 20 and Theostat 80, and by the early 1980s in a tablet form called Quibron.

References

External links 

Adenosine receptor antagonists
Beta1-adrenergic agonists
Bitter compounds
Merck brands
Bronchodilators
Phosphodiesterase inhibitors
Xanthines
Histone Acetyltransferase Inhibitor